Gazeta.ua ( 'Newspaper in Ukrainian') is an illustrated newspaper based in Kyiv covering politics, economics, culture, sports, arts, and other different topics and aimed at Ukrainian-language readers. It is chiefly published in Ukrainian, but quotes in Russian are not translated. The newspaper has its own website, Gazeta.ua, where archives and additional information not included in the print newspaper may be found. It has also editorial offices in Lviv, Vinnytsia, Poltava, and Cherkasy. The owner of the newspaper is New Information Publishing Group, which also owns the magazine Krayina (The Country).

See also
List of newspapers in Ukraine

External links
Gazeta.ua website

2005 establishments in Ukraine
Newspapers established in 2005
Ukrainian-language newspapers
Newspapers published in Ukraine